The Seely Baronetcy, of Sherwood Lodge in Arnold in the County of Nottingham and Brook House in Brooke on the Isle of Wight, is a title in the Baronetage of the United Kingdom. It was created on 19 February 1896 for the industrialist Charles Seely (1833–1915), son and namesake of Charles Seely (1803–1887). The first baronet's grandson, the third Baronet, was created Baron Sherwood, of Calverton in the County of Nottingham, in the Peerage of the United Kingdom in 1941. The peerage became extinct on his death, but he was succeeded in the baronetcy by his younger brother, the fourth Baronet. As of 2019, the title is held by the latter's grandson, the sixth baronet.

The soldier and Liberal politician Jack Seely, 1st Baron Mottistone, was the fourth son of the first Baronet.

Seely baronets, of Sherwood Lodge and Brooke House (1896)
Sir Charles Seely, 1st Baronet (1833–1915)
Sir Charles Hilton Seely, 2nd Baronet (1859–1926)
Sir Hugh Michael Seely, 3rd Baronet (1898–1970) (created Baron Sherwood in 1941)

Barons Sherwood (1941)
Hugh Michael Seely, 1st Baron Sherwood (1898–1970) succeeded in the baronetcy only by his brother.

Seely baronets, of Sherwood Lodge and Brooke House (1896; Reverted)
Sir Victor Basil John Seely, 4th Baronet (1900–1980) succeeded by his eldest son
Sir Nigel Edward Seely, 5th Baronet (1923–2019) succeeded by his nephew
Sir William Victor Conway Seely, 6th Baronet (born 1983).

The heir presumptive is the current holder's first cousin once removed, Charles John Howell Seely (born 1937).

See also
Baron Mottistone

Notes

References
Kidd, Charles, Williamson, David (editors). Debrett's Peerage and Baronetage (1990 edition). New York: St Martin's Press, 1990, 

Seely family crest  in A History of the County of Hampshire: Volume 5

Seely
Seely family